Pique verde boricua is a Puerto Rican green hot sauce.

Preparation
Pique verde is made from roasting ají caballero chilies, cubanelle peppers, garlic, onions, and blended with fresh parsley, cilantro, culantro, olive oil, and lime juice.

This sauce may be served with meats, fish, tostones, viandas (root vegetables), mofongo, rice and beans.

See also 

 Ajilimójili
 Mojo

References

Puerto Rican cuisine